Gaston Berger (1 October 1896 – 13 November 1960) was a French futurist but also an industrialist, a philosopher and a state manager. He is mainly known for his remarkably lucid analysis of Edmund Husserl's phenomenology and for his studies on the character structure.

Berger was born in Saint-Louis, Senegal, French West Africa (now Senegal). He received his primary and part of his secondary education in Perpignan, France, and had to take up a position in an industrial firm.  After having performed his military duties in World War I, he became an associate of the owner of the firm. Berger decided to continue his studies. He worked with Rene Le Senne and passed his baccalaureat. He then enrolled in the University of Aix-en-Provence, where he studied philosophy under Maurice Blondel. Having passed his licence, he obtained a diploma d’Etudes Superieures with a thesis on the ‘Relations between the conditions of intelligibility on the one hand and the problem of contingency on the other hand’. In 1926 Berger founded with some friends the Societe de Philosophie du Sud-est and its periodical . In 1938 he organized the first Congress of French Language Societies of Philosophy. In 1941 he submitted his two theses de doctorat d’Etat, the first entitled ‘Investigations on the conditions of Knowledge. Essay of Pure Knowledge’, the second ‘The ‘Cogito’ in Husserl’s philosophy’. Berger then left his industrial firm and became first a 'Chargé de Cours', then a 'Maitre de Conferences' for philosophy at the University of Aix-en Provence. In 1944 he became full professor. In 1949 he became secretary general of the Fulbright Commission, in charge of the cultural relations between France and the United States.

After managing a fertilizer plant during the 1930s, he created in Paris the Centre Universitaire International et des Centres de Prospective and directed the philosophical studies (Études philosophiques). The term prospective, invented by Gaston Berger, is the study of the possible futures.

From 1953 to 1960 he was in charge of the tertiary education at the Minister of National Education and modernised the French universities system. He was elected at the Académie des Sciences Morales et Politiques in 1955.

In 1957 he founded the journal  Prospective and the homonym centre with André Gros. This same year he created the Institut national des sciences appliquées (INSA) of Lyon with the rector Capelle.

He was the father of the French choreographer Maurice Béjart (1927–2007), a stage name for Maurice-Jean Berger. The university of Saint-Louis, Senegal, where he was born is named after him.

Main works

 Recherches sur les conditions de la connaissance, Paris, PUF, 1941
 Le Cogito dans la philosophie de Husserl, Paris, Aubier, 1941
 Traité pratique d’analyse du caractère, Paris, PUF, 1950
 Questionnaire caractérologique, PUF, Paris, 1950
 Caractère et personnalité, Paris, PUF, 1954

External links
 Biography in French
 Gaston Berger philosophe et homme d'action in French

1896 births
1960 deaths
20th-century French philosophers
Phenomenologists
French industrialists
Futurologists
Members of the Académie des sciences morales et politiques
French male writers
20th-century French male writers
French people in French Senegal